Elitch Gardens Theme & Water Park, colloquially known as Elitches, is an amusement park in Denver, Colorado. It is owned by Kroenke Sports & Entertainment and operated by Premier Parks, LLC. Distinctive for being located in a downtown area, it is open April through October.

History

Gurtler era (1994–1995)

As space was getting scarce at the original location of Elitch Gardens at 38th Avenue and Tennyson Street, the Gurtler family and their financial partners purchased a  plot of land in the Platte River valley near downtown Denver for the price of $6.1 million in June 1994. $90 million was spent relocating some rides from the original park and construction of the new park. The money was from a mix of public and private dollars and various loans.

On October 1, 1994—the end of the 1994 season—the original park closed permanently and a majority of the rides were moved to the new property, which opened on May 27, 1995. Attendance was about one million the first year there, lower than the expected 1.2 million. Some notable rides at the park's opening were the original Carousel and Sidewinder roller coaster, relocated from the old park; and a new version of the Mister Twister, the Twister II.

In October, 1996, the Gurtler family and its partners sold the park to growing theme park operator Premier Parks for $65 million.

Premier era (1996–1998)
Premier noted the lackluster figures the new park had in its first two seasons, and so new additions were rushed in for the park's third season in 1997. The first and most notable addition that year was the park's third roller coaster, Mind Eraser, a Suspended Looping Coaster by Vekoma. Also added was the park's 700-seat Trocadero Theater, named after the famous ballroom and dance hall at the original park. The price tag for these additions came to a total of $28 million.

Throughout this short era, the park had "The Great Escape" as a surname underneath the park's name in its logo, like most of its sister parks at the time, (Darien Lake, Riverside Park, and The Great Escape)

In April 1998, Premier Parks purchased the Six Flags Theme Parks from Time Warner. With this acquisition, Premier re-branded some of their other parks as new Six Flags theme parks as part of a deal made between Time Warner and Premier. Elitch Gardens was one of these parks, and big changes came the next year.

Six Flags era (1999–2006)

Numerous additions came in 1999 when the park was officially rebranded Six Flags Elitch Gardens. The first and most notable addition as a Six Flags theme park was Boomerang: Coast to Coaster. Various Warner Bros. properties, including the Looney Tunes and DC Comics franchises, were also introduced, which including costumed characters and shows.

Throughout 1999 to 2001, additions were rushed in, such as the new Looney Tunes Movietown area of the park, as well as water rides and flat rides.

In 2002, the park added Flying Coaster, a suspended steel flying roller coaster. It was a prototype model, and suffered from numerous operational glitches. It ceased operation in 2008, and was eventually sold to Luna Park in Coney Island in 2010, where it was installed in 2011 after being refurbished and updated by ride manufacturer Zamperla.

In 2004, the park installed the Half Pipe coaster, one of three operating in the United States.

In 2005, Six Flags removed Chance-Morgan Chaos flat rides for safety reasons. The same year, the park added a vertical water slide called Edge to its Island Kingdom water park.

Also in 2005, control of Six Flags was obtained by Washington Redskins owner Daniel Snyder, in a proxy fight following a shareholder revolt, which led to Kieran Burke being ousted as CEO. Snyder installed friend and former ESPN executive Mark Shapiro as the company's new CEO.

The park faced a grim future in 2006 when Shapiro announced that the company would sell off six of its properties. Costumed workers and entertainment workers were laid off as a part of cost-cutting.

PARC Management era (2007–2010) 
In October 2006, Six Flags announced that Elitch Gardens, along with six other parks, would be sold for a total of $312 million. The agreement saw them sell the properties to PARC Management, who in turn sold them to CNL Lifestyle Properties. CNL would then lease them back to PARC Management under a 52-year triple-net lease.

An immediate change under the new management was the removal of all Looney Tunes and DC Comics branding uses from the park. A new ProSlide Bowl water slide, named RipQurl, was added for the 2007 season. In 2008 a new interactive dark ride, Ghost Blasters, opened. It takes guests through a dark mansion haunted with ghosts. Using light guns, guests have the opportunity to extinguish the ghosts while competing against one another as digital counters keep track of the scores. Alongside the new rides, the park hosts a summer concert series which has included Raven-Symoné, Metro Station, Sara Evans, and Lee Ann Womack. It also has live entertainment shows, such as "Survivor Live!", and "Sea Lion Splash!" The ones for 2010 were "Rocknation: Don't Stop Believin'", "Bob the Builder Live: Let's Recycle!", "120 Rockin' Years at Elitch's" and "Laser Rocks". During October it has haunted houses and a Trick or Treat Trail.

CNL Lifestyle Properties era (2011–2014) 
However, after less than three years into the 52-year contracts, CNL terminated their agreements with PARC Management in November 2010. The move came after, according to their 2010 SEC filings, PARC defaulted on their lease obligations on the properties. In early 2011, CNL appointed Herschend Family Entertainment as the new operators of the park, along with Darien Lake.

On March 8, the park announced three new rides, Tube Top (a Proslide Tantrum waterslide) in Island Kingdom Family Water Park, Rockin’ Tug, and Tike Bikes both in the newly transformed kid's area, KiddieLand.

In 2013, the park's operation was transferred from Herschend Family Entertainment to CNL Lifestyle.

Premier Parks LLC era (2015-2020)
On June 5, 2015 the park was purchased by an investment team made up of Revesco Properties, Kroenke Sports Entertainment, and Second City Real Estate. Operation remained under the control of Premier Parks, LLC.

Due to the growing concerns of the COVID-19 pandemic, Elitch Gardens announced a delay of the 2020 season operations. On July 31, 2020, with the ongoing pandemic, the park announced that the park will not operate at all for the remainder of 2020. The cancellation is the first time in 130 years, that the park closed down for an entire season, with the park's entire 130th season instead being deferred to 2021.

Future of Elitch Gardens ("The River Mile" redevelopment)
In June 2018, it was announced that the current site of Elitch Gardens would be the site of a massive redevelopment project by Revesco Properties named "The River Mile" in the near future.

On December 19, the Denver City Council voted 12–0 in favor of giving Revesco Properties permission to begin the project.

No further details, including a permanent closing date for Elitch Gardens or relocation have been announced. However, there are rumors that it will relocate.

Entertainment & special events
In 1998, Six Flags' Fright Fest debuted at the park. The event was typically held at the end of the operating season (October) until 2006.

When the park was sold to PARC Management in 2007, a replacement event for Fright Fest named "Fall Family Fun Fest" added family oriented areas such as hay mazes and pumpkin painting, as well as haunted houses and trick or treat trails.

In 2008, "FrightFest" was reinstituted, but with a lack of space between the words "Fright" and "Fest" in order to avoid legal trouble with Six Flags. The event continued on for several years, including 2011-2014 when Herschend Family Entertainment managed the property. The park is currently managed by Premier Parks, LLC, who continues to host the event.

Island Kingdom Family Water Park
Island Kingdom is a  family water park located next to the entrance of Elitch Gardens.  It is open in Summer, and admission is included with admission to Elitch Gardens.  It has several main attractions: a large tube slide tower, a family body slide tower, a family water playground, a large family raft ride, a half pipe water attraction, and a lazy river.  Palm trees are planted yearly to add to the atmosphere.  There is a race of rubber duckies to support charity on opening day.

Public transportation

There is an RTD light rail stop located next to the park's entrance, served by C, E, and W line trains.  The tram station also serves neighboring Ball Arena.  Many park visitors take mass transit instead of paying for expensive parking.  There is a bus station just off park grounds as well, which is served by route 10 operated by First Transit.

Rides

Roller coasters

Thrill rides

Family rides

Kids' Rides

Water rides

Water Park Rides

Past rides

See also
Incidents at CNL Income Properties parks

References

External links

Elitch Gardens Official Site

 
1890 establishments in Colorado
Amusement parks in Colorado
Tourist attractions in Denver
Landmarks in Colorado
Buildings and structures in Denver
Herschend Family Entertainment
Former PARC Management theme parks
Amusement parks opened in 1890
Premier Parks, LLC